The Nizamabad–Kacheguda DEMU is a tri-daily train that runs between the cities of Nizamabad and Hyderabad both situated in state of Telangana. The trains runs on Secunderabad–Manmad line of Hyderabad railway division under South Central Railway zone.

History
The train service was started in March 2012 which used to run twice a day from Nizamabad to Kacheguda and on daily basis except on Thursday and Sunday. Later on in early 2015 seeing the high rush of passengers between these two major cities of the state, the South Central Railway flagged off another train from Nizamabad at 18:40 IST.
As of Aug 2019,the 3 services run on a daily basis from Nizamabad railway station to Kacheguda railway station.

Service
The fare from Nizamabad to Kacheguda is 35 INR.

See also

 Nizamabad–Peddapalli section
 Ajanta Express

References 

Rail transport in Telangana
Transport in Hyderabad, India
Diesel–electric multiple units of India